The 1919–20 Dartmouth men's ice hockey season was the 14th season of play for the program.

Season
Dartmouth returned to the ice after a year layoff, due in part to the end of World War I. The Greens opened their intercollegiate season with two shutout victories over Tufts but when they encountered Harvard the teams fought a pitched battle for supremacy of the 1920 season. The score was close but Dartmouth fell 3–4. Harvard won all of its remaining games and claimed the intercollegiate championship. The Greens continued to play well against collegiate opponents, surrendering only a single goal over their next four games to finish with an impressive record. Dartmouth was runner-up for the championship once more, and while that could have presaged good things in the near future, head coach Clarence Wanamaker resigned from his position at the end of the season.

Note: Dartmouth College did not possess a moniker for its athletic teams until the 1920s, however, the university had adopted 'Dartmouth Green' as its school color in 1866.

Roster

Standings

Schedule and Results

|-
!colspan=12 style=";" | Regular Season

References

Dartmouth Big Green men's ice hockey seasons
Dartmouth
Dartmouth
Dartmouth
Dartmouth